Romania competed at the 1964 Winter Olympics in Innsbruck, Austria.  The nation returned to the Winter Games after having boycotted the 1960 Winter Olympics due to the U.S. ban imposed to East Germany.

Biathlon

Men

 1 Two minutes added per miss.

Bobsleigh

Cross-country skiing

Men

Ice hockey

First round
Winners (in bold) qualified for the Group A to play for 1st-8th places. Teams, which lost their qualification matches, played in Group B for 9th-16th places.

|}

Consolation round 

Poland 6-1 Romania
Japan 6-4 Romania
Romania 5-5 Yugoslavia
Austria 2-5 Romania
Norway 4-2 Romania
Romania 6-2 Italy
Romania 8-3 Hungary

References
Official Olympic Reports 
 Olympic Winter Games 1964, full results by sports-reference.com

Nations at the 1964 Winter Olympics
1964
1964 in Romanian sport